Tau Ceti f is a super-Earth or mini-Neptune orbiting Tau Ceti that was discovered in 2012 by statistical analyses of the star's variations in radial velocity, based on data obtained using HIRES, AAPS, and HARPS. It is of interest because its orbit places it in Tau Ceti's extended habitable zone, but a 2015 study implies that there may not be a detectable biosignature because it has only been in the temperate zone for less than one billion years.

Characteristics 

Few properties of the planet are known other than its orbit and mass. It orbits Tau Ceti at a distance of 1.35 AU (roughly Mars's perihelion in the Solar System) with an orbital period of 642 days, and has a minimum mass of 3.93 Earth masses. However, if it and its companion planets were similarly inclined to Tau Ceti's debris disk at °, f could  and  Earth masses, which means it's slightly more likely to be a mini-Neptune, although the exoplanet is included in the conservative sample of potentially habitable exoplanets. It is estimated to be 1.81 Earth radii.

Habitability 
 
As of October 2020, Tau Ceti f is considered the most potentially habitable exoplanet orbiting a Sun-like star. Its neighbor, Tau Ceti e, was previously regarded as a potentially habitable exoplanet in the conservative sample, but it was determined to likely be too hot to hold life, more similar to Venus. It and its companion may suffer from a continuous bombardment of asteroids, up to 10 times higher than in the Solar System, but a conjectured (super-)Jovian planet as outlined in a 2019 Astronomy & Astrophysics paper may be shepherding the disk, as it may be as close as 3 AU and as far away as 20.

With a flux of 0.32 the flux on Earth, Tau Ceti f has an estimated equilibrium temperature of only 190 Kelvin. If the conditions were the same as on the Earth, Tau Ceti f's average temperature would be around -50 °C. However, with a thicker atmosphere and a larger ocean, the temperature could be similar to Earth's.

See also
Sub-Neptune

References

Exoplanets discovered in 2012
Tau Ceti